Alonso Jorge Solís Calderón  (born October 14, 1978) is a Costa Rican retired footballer and singer who played  for Saprissa as attacking midfielder or striker.

Club career
Known as El Mariachi, Solís made his professional debut for Saprissa on 28 January 1996 against Municipal Pérez Zeledón and scored his first goal on 13 April 1997 against Carmelita.

Europe
He then spent a good deal of time abroad, with Universidad Católica in Chile, OFI Crete in Greece, and SK Brann in Norway.

Saprissa
Solís had an extremely impressive 2003/4 season with Saprissa, finishing third in the league in goals with 17, while leading Saprissa to an easy first-place finish in the league. With Saprissa, he has won four national championships and a CONCACAF Champions Cup, and was part of the team that played the 2005 FIFA Club World Championship Toyota Cup, where Saprissa finished third behind São Paulo and Liverpool Because of his natural talent for the game, he left a very good impression in the tournament.

Due his performance, at the end of the last season he received many offers from clubs in Mexico, Brasil and even in Costa Rica, but he decided to stay in Saprissa. Due to Walter Gaitán's injury, Solis was loaned to Necaxa for 3 months, starting on March 17, 2008. The Mexicans could not offer him a contract due to the foreign player quota. He was one of the most loved and claimed by the crowd while he played at Deportivo Saprissa. In his final game with Saprissa, visiting archrival Liga Deportiva Alajuelense, Solis scored an excellent goal, which gave them the 0–1 win, Saprissa's 9th consecutive win in the 2008 Clausura Championship. He ended up playing 292 league games for Saprissa, scoring 98 goals.

In January 2012, Solís was signed by Bengal Premier League side Durgapur only to discover the league was postponed and eventually cancelled.

In November 2012, he was cleared to play for LINAFA outfit San Francisco de Dos Ríos, after having officially retired In August 2013, Solís made his debut as player-manager for second division side Generación Saprissa, Saprissa's reserve team.

International career
At junior level, he played in the 1995 FIFA U-17 World Championship held in Ecuador, and the 1997 FIFA World Youth Championship held in Malaysia.

Solís made his debut for Costa Rica in a May 1999 friendly match against Chile and earned a total of 48 caps, scoring 8 goals. He represented his country in 18 FIFA World Cup qualification matches and played at the 2003, 2005, and 2007 UNCAF Nations Cup, as well as at the 2007 CONCACAF Gold Cup and the 2004 Copa América.

His final international was an October 2008 FIFA World Cup qualification match against Haiti.

References

External links
 
 

1978 births
Living people
Footballers from San José, Costa Rica
Association football midfielders
Costa Rican footballers
Costa Rica international footballers
2003 UNCAF Nations Cup players
2004 Copa América players
2005 UNCAF Nations Cup players
2007 UNCAF Nations Cup players
2007 CONCACAF Gold Cup players
Copa Centroamericana-winning players
Deportivo Saprissa players
Club Deportivo Universidad Católica footballers
OFI Crete F.C. players
SK Brann players
Club Necaxa footballers
Eliteserien players
Liga FPD players
Liga MX players
Costa Rican expatriate footballers
Expatriate footballers in Norway
Expatriate footballers in Chile
Expatriate footballers in Greece
Expatriate footballers in Mexico
Costa Rican expatriate sportspeople in Norway
Costa Rican expatriate sportspeople in Chile
Costa Rican expatriate sportspeople in Greece
Costa Rican expatriate sportspeople in Mexico